St Mary's Catholic High School is a Roman Catholic secondary school located in Astley, in the Metropolitan Borough of Wigan, Greater Manchester, England. It is a large school hosting approximately 1,700  pupils including a sixth form.

Notable former pupils
Ciarán Griffiths, actor

References

External links
 School website

Secondary schools in the Metropolitan Borough of Wigan
Catholic secondary schools in the Archdiocese of Liverpool
Voluntary aided schools in England